Dr David Moore is a Manx politician and former Chairman of the Finance Board, the forerunner to the present Treasury Minister. He was Member of the House of Keys for Peel from 1978 until his retirement in 1986. In 1985, he was appointed the last Chairman of the Finance Board.

In 2007 he stood for election to the Legislative Council in the 5th round of voting against Laxey Commissioner David Owens and stood unopposed in the 6th round of voting but failed to be elected by one vote.

Governmental positions
Chairman of the Finance Board, 1985-1986
Member of the Executive Council, 1985-1986

References 

Living people
Members of the House of Keys 1976–1981
Members of the House of Keys 1981–1986
Year of birth missing (living people)
Place of birth missing (living people)